László Raffinsky (23 April 1905 – 31 July 1981) was a Romanian football player of Hungarian ethnicity who was a member of Romanian team which participated at the 1930 FIFA World Cup in Uruguay and 1938 FIFA World Cup in France. He holds the record for most goals scored in a Liga I match, scoring ten goals in the match between Juventus București and Dacia Unirea Brăila from 1929–1930 season.

Career

Club career 

László Raffinsky begun his football career in 1924, playing for Unirea, a football club from Timișoara. In 1925, Raffinsky moved to CA Timișoara, and then, in 1927, at Chinezul Timișoara, one of the Romania's best clubs at that time. But Raffinsky's new club entered in a financial crisis, and for the first time in seven years, Chinezul lost the Romanian championship. Eventually, Raffinsky leaves Chinezul in 1929, signing with Juventus București. In 1929–1930 season of Liga I, Raffinsky won his first title of champion with Juventus in which he managed to set a Liga I record of goals scored in a single match when he scored 10 goals in the 16–0 victory from the quarter-finals against Dacia Unirea Brăila and he also opened the score in the 3–0 victory against Gloria CFR Arad from the final. In 1931, he returns to Timișoara, playing for another symbol of interwar period Romanian football, Ripensia. He leaves Ripensia in 1933, after winning another Liga I – champion title, leaving Romania for playing in Czechoslovakia, at SK Židenice. He returns in Romania after two years, his come-back to Bucharest, where he previously played at Juventus, being linked with a move to Rapid. He played until 1940 for Rapid, winning for three times the Romanian Cup. In 1939, he was arrested, together with another three players of Rapid, Iuliu Baratky, Ştefan Auer and Ioan Bogdan, because of their win in the final of the Romanian Cup against Venus Bucharest. They were arrested at the order of Gabriel Marinescu, the Minister of Internal Affairs and the Prefect of Bucharest, who was also the chairman of Venus. After a huge scandal initiated by the press, the four players were released from the jail after a few days, and Gabriel Marinescu was arrested and executed in 1940. In 1940, Raffinsky retired from his playing career.

National Team 

László Raffinsky won twenty caps for the Romania national football team. His first match for Romania was a defeat, in 1929, against Yugoslavia. At his fourth match for the national team, Raffinsky scored his first and only goal for Romania, against Greece. In 1930, he was called to the Romanian squad which participated at the first FIFA World Cup, in Uruguay. But the chairman of Astra Romana, a company where Raffinsky and his team-mate Emerich Vogl were office workers, interdicted the two players to leave their workplace. At the intervention of Octav Luchide, the two players eventually took the SS Conte Verde ship to Uruguay. In Uruguay, Raffinsky played in both matches for Romania, against Peru and Uruguay. In the match against Peru, he was fouled by Plácido Galindo of Peru, who was dismissed for the foul, being the first player ever to be dismissed at the FIFA World Cup. He was also included in the 1930 FIFA World Cup Best Eleven. Raffinsky was not called up again at the national team until 1932, when he played in a 6–3 victory of Romania against France. After another three consecutive matches against Greece, Bulgaria and Yugoslavia, Raffinsky was not called up until 1937. In 1938, he was called again at a FIFA World Cup, playing for Romania in the two matches against Cuba. These two matches were the last matches at the national team for Raffinsky.

International goals

Manager career 

Despite being a successful player, László Rafinsky was not a great manager. He began his managerial career in 1944, coaching Prahova Ploieşti. He was the manager of the team from Ploieşti until 1945. He was the manager of another few Liga II and Liga III clubs, like Mica Brad, Chimica Târnăveni or Aurul Zlatna. In 1962, he moved to Cluj-Napoca, being for two years the manager of Tehnofrig, a small football club of the factory with the same name. In 1964, Ladislau Raffinsky retired from football.

Honours

Player
Juventus București
Liga I (1): 1929–30
Ripensia Timișoara
Liga I (1): 1932–33
Rapid București
Cupa României (4): 1936–37, 1937–38, 1938–39, 1939–40

References and notes

External links

1905 births
1930 FIFA World Cup players
1938 FIFA World Cup players
1981 deaths
Liga I players
CA Timișoara players
Chinezul Timișoara players
FC Rapid București players
FC Petrolul Ploiești players
FC Ripensia Timișoara players
FC Zbrojovka Brno players
Sportspeople from Miskolc
Romanian footballers
Romania international footballers
Romanian sportspeople of Hungarian descent
Association football midfielders